Ivan Rousev Marazov born 15 March 1942 in Pirne, near Aytos, is a Bulgarian artist, culturologist, thracologist and politician.

In 1996, Marazov was a candidate to become President of Bulgaria for the Bulgarian Socialist Party (with Irina Bokova as the vice-presidential candidate) and finished in second place.

References

External links
Personal website

Bulgarian politicians
Bulgarian artists
1942 births
Living people